Liverpool City was a semi-professional rugby league club. The club was based in the Stanley area of Liverpool, a metropolitan borough of Merseyside, England.

The club played in the Rugby League for only one season, in 1906–07.

History 
The club played in the Rugby League for the single season 1906-07 finishing in bottom place out of the 26 clubs (Pontefract had folded after only 8 games and their records were expunged, but even they had won 3 of these 8 matches).  The team lost all 30 league matches played. They did draw one game, against Bramley, but as the return fixture was cancelled, the first (drawn) fixture was expunged from the records.

Another club, also called Liverpool City was formed in 1951 when Liverpool Stanley changed their name and location. There is no connection between the two clubs.

Ground 
The club played at the Stanley Athletics Ground off Fairfield Street, Stanley.

Records 
The club do hold, jointly, the record of playing a whole season without a win.

See also 
British rugby league system
List of defunct rugby league clubs

References

External links
RL All time records

Defunct rugby league teams in England
Sport in Liverpool
Rugby clubs established in 1906
Rugby league teams in Merseyside
1906 establishments in England